Sugar & Allied Industries Limited (SAIL), also referred to as Kaliro Sugar Limited is a sugar manufacturer in Uganda.

Overview
The company also has 4,000 registered out-growers who collectively have  under sugar cane farming.
SAIL is the fourth-largest manufacturer of sugar in Uganda, producing an estimated 60,000 metric tonnes annually in 2013, accounting for approximately 14% of national output. Kakira Sugar Works, located in Kakira, Jinja District, is the nation's largest sugar producer, accounting for approximately 40% of national output. Kinyara Sugar Works (KSW), in Kinyara, Masindi District, is the second-largest producer of sugar in the country, accounting for about 27% of national output. Sugar Corporation of Uganda Limited (SCOUL), located in Lugazi, Buikwe District, produces about 14% of total national output. The remaining 6% is produced by Sango Bay Estates Limited, located in Kakuuto, Rakai District, Central Uganda. The estimated 450,000 metric tonnes of sugar produced by the five leading sugar manufacturers in Uganda is marketed to the Eastern African countries of Burundi, Democratic Republic of the Congo, Kenya, Rwanda, South Sudan, Tanzania and Uganda.

Location
Kaliro Sugar Limited is located in Bwayuya Village, Namugongo sub-county, Kaliro District, Eastern Uganda, near the town of Kaliro. The estimated coordinates of Kaliro Sugar Limited are 0°56'48.0"N, 33°29'13.0"E (Latitude:0.946660; 33.486936).

History
The sugar estate was founded in 2011. They also recruited and put under contract, an estimated 4,000 out-growers with an estimated , under sugar cane cultivation. The factory started crushing cane in June 2013, producing about 200 metric tonnes daily, translating into about 60,000 metric tonnes annually.

Ownership
Sugar and Allied Industries Limited is a privately owned company. It is a 100% subsidiary of the Alam Group of Companies, a Uganda-based conglomerate, with subsidiaries in other East African countries.

Memberships
SAIL is a member of Uganda Sugar Manufacturers' Association (USMA), an industry group of leading sugar manufacturers in the county.

Co-generation
SAIL owns and operates Kaliro Power Station, a bagasse-fired thermal power station, that is incorporated in the SAIL sugar factory. The power plant generates 12MW of power, of which 3MW are used internally by SAIL and 9MW are sold to Uganda's national electric grid.

See also

References

External links
  Homepage of Uganda Sugar Manufacturers Association (USMA)

Food and drink companies established in 2011
Kaliro District
Eastern Region, Uganda
Sugar companies of Uganda
Alam Group
Agriculture in Uganda
2011 establishments in Uganda